The helium hydride ion or hydridohelium(1+) ion or helonium is a cation (positively charged ion) with chemical formula HeH+. It consists of a helium atom bonded to a hydrogen atom, with one electron removed. It can also be viewed as protonated helium. It is the lightest heteronuclear ion, and is believed to be the first compound formed in the Universe after the Big Bang.

The ion was first produced in a laboratory in 1925. It is stable in isolation, but extremely reactive, and cannot be prepared in bulk, because it would react with any other molecule with which it came into contact. Noted as the strongest known acid—stronger than even fluoroantimonic acid—its occurrence in the interstellar medium had been conjectured since the 1970s, and it was finally detected in April 2019 using the airborne SOFIA telescope.

Physical properties 
The helium hydrogen ion is isoelectronic with molecular hydrogen.

Unlike the dihydrogen ion , the helium hydride ion has a permanent dipole moment, which makes its spectroscopic characterization easier. The calculated dipole moment of HeH+ is 2.26 or 2.84 D. The electron density in the ion is higher around the helium nucleus than the hydrogen. 80% of the electron charge is closer to the helium nucleus than to the hydrogen nucleus.

Spectroscopic detection is hampered, because one of its most prominent spectral lines, at 149.14 μm, coincides with a doublet of spectral lines belonging to the methylidyne radical ⫶CH.

The length of the covalent bond in the ion is 0.772 Å.

Isotopologues
The helium hydride ion has six relatively stable isotopologues, that differ in the isotopes of the two elements, and hence in the total atomic mass number (A) and the total number of neutrons (N) in the two nuclei:

They all have three protons and two electrons. The first three are generated by radioactive decay of tritium in the molecules HT = , DT = , and  = , respectively.

The following isotopologues of the helium hydride ion, of the dihydrogen ion , and of the trihydrogen ion  have the same total atomic mass number A:

The masses in each row above are not equal, though, because the binding energies in the nuclei are different.

Neutral molecule
Unlike the helium hydride ion, the neutral helium hydride molecule HeH is not stable in the ground state. However, it does exist in an excited state as an excimer (HeH*), and its spectrum was first observed in the mid-1980s.

The neutral molecule is the first entry in the Gmelin database.

Chemical properties and reactions

Preparation

Since HeH+ cannot be stored in any usable form, its chemistry must be studied by forming it in situ.

Reactions with organic substances, for example, can be studied by creating a tritium derivative of the desired organic compound. Decay of tritium to 3He+ followed by its extraction of a hydrogen atom yields 3HeH+ which is then surrounded by the organic material and will in turn react.

Acidity
HeH+ cannot be prepared in a condensed phase, as it would donate a proton to any anion, molecule or atom that it came in contact with. Other molecules such as nitric oxide, nitrogen dioxide, nitrous oxide, hydrogen sulfide, methane, acetylene, ethylene, ethane, methanol and acetonitrile react but break up due to the large amount of energy produced.

In fact, HeH+ is the strongest known acid, with a proton affinity of 177.8 kJ/mol. The hypothetical aqueous acidity can be estimated using Hess's law:

 {|
|-
| HeH+(g) 
| → 
| H+(g) 
| + He(g) 
| align=right|+178 kJ/mol
|  
|-
| HeH+(aq) 
| → 
| HeH+(g)
|  
| align=right|+973 kJ/mol
|   (a)
|-
| H+(g) 
| → 
| H+(aq)
|  
| align=right|−1530 kJ/mol
|  
|- style="border-bottom:2px solid black"
| He(g) 
| → 
| He(aq)
|  
| align=right|+19 kJ/mol
|   (b)
|-
| HeH+(aq)
| →
| H+(aq)
| + He(aq)
| align=right|−360 kJ/mol
|  
|-
|}
(a) Estimated to be same as for Li+(aq) → Li+(g).
(b) Estimated from solubility data.

A free energy change of dissociation of −360 kJ/mol is equivalent to a pKa of −63 at 298 K.

Other helium-hydrogen ions
Additional helium atoms can attach to HeH+ to form larger clusters such as He2H+, He3H+, He4H+, He5H+ and He6H+.

The dihelium hydride cation, He2H+, is formed by the reaction of dihelium cation with molecular hydrogen:
  + H2 → He2H+ + H
It is a linear ion with hydrogen in the centre.

The hexahelium hydride ion, He6H+, is particularly stable.

Other helium hydride ions are known or have been studied theoretically. Helium dihydride ion, or dihydridohelium(1+), has been observed using microwave spectroscopy. It has a calculated binding energy of 25.1 kJ/mol, while trihydridohelium(1+), has a calculated binding energy of 0.42 kJ/mol.

History

Discovery in ionization experiments
Hydridohelium(1+), specifically , was first detected indirectly in 1925 by T. R. Hogness and E. G. Lunn. From these data, they concluded that the  ions were transferring a proton to molecules that they collided with, including helium.

Both ions have 3 protons, 2 neutrons, and 2 electrons.

Early theoretical studies
The first attempt to compute the structure of the HeH+ ion (specifically) by quantum mechanical theory was made by J. Beach in 1936.  Improved computations were sporadically published over the next decades.

Tritium decay methods in chemistry
H. Schwartz observed in 1955 that the decay of the tritium molecule  =  should generate the helium hydride ion  with high probability.

In 1963, F. Cacace at the Sapienza University of Rome conceived the decay technique for preparing and studying organic radicals and carbenium ions. In a variant of that technique, the exotic species like the methonium cation are produced by reacting organic compounds with the  that is produced by the decay of  that is mixed with the desired reagents.  Much of what we know about the chemistry of  came through this technique.

Implications for neutrino mass experiments
In 1980, V. Lubimov (Lyubimov) at the ITEP laboratory in Moscow claimed to have detected a mildly significant rest mass (30 ± 16) eV for the neutrino, by analyzing the energy spectrum of the β decay of tritium. The claim was disputed, and several other groups set out to check it by studying the decay of molecular tritium . It was known that some of the energy released by that decay would be diverted to the excitation of the decay products, including ; and this phenomenon could be a significant source of error in that experiment. This observation motivated numerous efforts to precisely compute the expected energy states of that ion in order to reduce the uncertainty of those measurements.

Spectral predictions and detection
In 1956, M. Cantwell predicted theoretically that the spectrum of vibrations of that ion should be observable in the infrared; and the spectra of the deuterium and common hydrogen isotopologues ( and ) should lie closer to visible light and hence easier to observe. In 1982, P. Bernath and T. Amano detected nine infrared lines between 2,164 and 3,158 waves per cm.

Interstellar space
HeH+ has long been conjectured since the 1970s to exist in the interstellar medium. Its first detection, in the nebula NGC 7027, was reported in an article published in the journal Nature in April 2019.

Natural occurrence

From decay of tritium
The helium hydride ion is formed during the decay of tritium in the molecule HT or tritium molecule T2. Although excited by the recoil from the beta decay, the molecule remains bound together.

Interstellar medium
It is believed to be the first compound to have formed in the universe, and is of fundamental importance in understanding the chemistry of the early universe. This is because hydrogen and helium were almost the only types of atoms formed in Big Bang nucleosynthesis. Stars formed from the primordial material should contain HeH+, which could influence their formation and subsequent evolution. In particular, its strong dipole moment makes it relevant to the opacity of zero-metallicity stars. HeH+ is also thought to be an important constituent of the atmospheres of helium-rich white dwarfs, where it increases the opacity of the gas and causes the star to cool more slowly.

HeH+ could be formed in the cooling gas behind dissociative shocks in dense interstellar clouds, such as the shocks caused by stellar winds, supernovae and outflowing material from young stars. If detected, the emissions from HeH+ would then be useful tracers of the shock.

Several locations had been suggested as possible places HeH+ might be detected. These included cool helium stars, H II regions, and dense planetary nebulae, like NGC 7027, where, in April 2019, HeH+ was reported to have been detected.

See also
 Dihydrogen cation
 Trihydrogen cation

References 

Acids
Superacids
Cations
Helium compounds
Hydrogen compounds
Substances discovered in the 1920s